The 2021–22 Syrian Premier League season is the 50th since its establishment. This season's league featured one stage. It pitted one group of 14 teams and kicked off on 13 August 2021. Tishreen are the defending champions, having won the previous season championship.

Teams

Stadiums and locations

League table

Results

References

Syrian Premier League seasons
Syria